Marco Hofschneider (born 18 October 1969) is a German actor known for his biographical portrayal of Solomon Perel in the 1990 acclaimed (Golden Globe-winning and Academy Award-nominated) World War II film Europa Europa. Since then, he has appeared in many German and British film and television programs. His older brother, René Hofschneider, also appeared in Europa Europa, playing the role of Isaak Perel, Solomon Perel's older brother.

Hofschneider was born in Berlin, Germany.

Filmography

References

External links

1969 births
Living people
Male actors from Berlin
German male television actors
German male film actors
20th-century German male actors
21st-century German male actors